Zgornji Kocjan is a small settlement in the hills above Mota in the Municipality of Radenci in northeastern Slovenia.

References

External links
Zgornji Kocjan on Geopedia

Populated places in the Municipality of Radenci